It's Showtime is a Philippine noontime variety show produced by ABS-CBN Entertainment that premiered on October 24, 2009, at the former ABS-CBN television network. The program formerly aired on ABS-CBN until May 5, 2020, when the network was forced to cease and desist its broadcasting operations as ordered by the National Telecommunications Commission after its legislative franchise expired on May 4, 2020. 

It's Showtime currently airs on pay television network Kapamilya Channel and is simulcast on A2Z and TV5 from 12:45 p.m. to 3:00 p.m. Mondays to Saturdays. It also airs worldwide via TFC, and streams online on Facebook and YouTube via Kapamilya Online Live. A primetime encore telecast also airs on Jeepney TV (later moved as a simulcast show).

It's Showtime is the second live entertainment program in the Philippines to be broadcast in high-definition behind ASAP Natin 'To. The program is currently ABS-CBN's longest-running daily noontime variety show after surpassing the original run of MTB or Magandang Tanghali Bayan (1998–2005) in 2016.

Overview

Showtime! and Magpasikat (2009–2012) 
Showtime premiered on October 24, 2009, at 10:30 AM, as a competition program, airing before the network's noontime shows, and served as the replacing Pilipinas, Game Ka Na Ba? following its successful eight-year morning run. The original hosts include Vhong Navarro, Anne Curtis, Kim Atienza, Jugs Jugueta, Teddy Corpuz, and Vice Ganda as the resident hurado (unevictable judge). In the third season, the show added former hurados Billy Crawford and Karylle as hosts.

In the first four seasons, Showtimes original competition format was that three groups, each made up of 2 to 25 members (with no age limit) perform a single performance, either a dance and/or song number. Before the performance, one group member is given 20 seconds to make an introduction before ending with the phrase "It's Showtime!". After the group's performance, the hurados, with the help of the studio audience, rate the group from 1 to 10. The group with the highest average score from the hurados wins the competition. The daily winner perform again to compete in the weekly finals. The winning weekly finalists advance to the monthly finals. The winning monthly finalists get the chance to complete in the grand finals. In the wildcard week, selected groups from the weekly and monthly finals are invited back to compete again for a slot in the grand finals.

Aside from the talent competition, Showtime also aired mini-segments that offer cash prizes to the studio audiences.

In October 2010, the show moved to the noontime slot, serving as the lead-in program for Pilipinas Win Na Win which was pushed back to an early afternoon timeslot. On February 12, 2011, the program returned to its original timeslot to give way for the premiere of Happy Yipee Yehey!

On January 28, 2012, Showtime aired a special episode to end its two-year morning competition format with an impartial farewell. It was later revealed that the program was preparing for a reformat as a noontime variety show.

It's Showtime (2012–2020) 

It's Showtime premiered on February 6, 2012, on its new timeslot at 11:30 AM, replacing Happy Yipee Yehey! This marks the return of the show to noontime slot after one year. The program was previously simulcast on then-Studio 23 and CgeTV's website during the first months of the relaunch. It's Showtime brought back its original competition format as a special segment while launching new segments.

It retained all of its main hosts while adding Jhong Hilario, Ryan Bang, Coleen Garcia and Eric "Eruption" Tai. In January 2016, Amy Perez and Mariel Rodriguez joined the program as main hosts. The program also debuted its all-male dance group Hashtags and its all-female dance group GirlTrends. On February 14, 2017, new Hashtags members were introduced. In May 2017, Nadine Lustre and James Reid were added as main hosts.

In October 2018, It's Showtime launched its own YouTube channel Showtime Online Universe. Three digital programs premiered on the channel: And I Thank You with Miss Q & A segment grand winner Juliana Parizcova Segovia; Hashtag Roadtrip with the Hashtag members; and Donna What To Do with Funny One segment season two grand winner Donna Cariaga. The Showtime Online Universe received a Silver Creator Award after getting 100,000 channel subscribers in January 2019.

Before 2019 ended, hosts Crawford, Garcia, Tai, Reid, Lustre, Marquez, and Atienza left.

Second decade (2020–present) 

On March 10, 2020, It's Showtime temporarily disallowed admission of live audience members following the government's declaration of a state public health emergency due to the COVID-19 pandemic in the Philippines. On March 15, 2020, the show's production was temporarily suspended in compliance with the government's declaration of a community quarantine in Metro Manila to curb the spread of COVID-19. It's Showtime aired a mix of episode replays and live episodes via Zoom. On April 29, 2020, the program's timeslot was shortened as part of the network's programming changes.

On May 5, 2020, It's Showtime, along with other ABS-CBN programs, stopped its broadcast operations following the National Telecommunications Commission's issuance of a cease and desist order to ABS-CBN's free to air stations due to the expiration of the network's 25-year franchise.

On June 13, 2020, the show resumed its broadcast with a shortened 150-minute timeslot on pay television network Kapamilya Channel which is owned and operated by ABS-CBN Corporation. The show's "Kuya Escort" Ion Perez and "Ate Girl" Jackie Gonzaga  become the show's main host of It's Showtime. It is also simulcast on Jeepney TV and streamed online on Facebook and YouTube via Showtime Online Ü and Kapamilya Online Live.

On July 13, 2020, following an employee working at ABS-CBN testing positive for COVID-19, It's Showtime and Magandang Buhay temporarily suspended live airings and aired replays. Also, the same instance later happened again when a Modified Enhanced community quarantine was temporarily reimposed in Metro Manila and again with the sudden surge of coronavirus cases in portions of Luzon on March 18, 2021.

On September 28, 2020, Kim Chiu officially joined It's Showtime as a main host and a permanent replacement to Mariel Rodriguez, after being a guest host in the previous years.

On October 10, 2020, It's Showtime celebrated its return to free TV via A2Z Channel 11 under a blocktime agreement between ABS-CBN and religious broadcaster, ZOE Broadcasting Network.

In November 2020, Bobet Vidanes left the show after working as the director for almost 10 years. Boyet Valdemor takes responsibility for the directoral duties of the show's continuation.

On March 16, 2021, Vice Ganda announced at It's Showtime's segment Tawag ng Tanghalan that the show will move to a new studio soon.

From March 18 to April 10, 2021, It's Showtime temporarily suspended their live productions due to the post-holiday surge of COVID-19 cases in the Greater Manila Area. The show resumed new episodes on April 12, 2021, airing three pre-taped episodes (this includes past Holy Week Episodes) before resuming their live episodes on April 15, 2021.

On April 12, 2021, Jhong Hilario temporarily left the show to take care of his wife and newborn baby.

On May 29, 2021, following the launching of the show's new segment "ReINA Ng Tahanan", the program has been co-directed by John Prats.

On August 7, 2021, It's Showtime temporarily moved its studio to Hilton Clark Sun Valley Resort in Pampanga due to enhanced community quarantine in Metro Manila, until August 21, 2021.

On October 2, 2021, Ogie Alcasid temporarily joined It's Showtime as guest co-host while Vice Ganda, Kim Chiu, Karylle and Ion Perez were on temporary leave. On November 13, 2021, Alcasid was officially announced as a main host of It's Showtime. Meanwhile, Jon Moll was named as the show's new permanent director, officially replacing Bobet Vidanes.

From January 6 to 15, 2022, It's Showtime temporarily suspended their live productions on 10-day break due to the surge of COVID-19 cases in the country caused by the SARS-CoV-2 Omicron variant. The show resumes the live broadcast on January 17, 2022.

On May 28, 2022, Anne Curtis returned to It's Showtime after two years of her hiatus, and a few days later, on June 4, 2022, Jhong Hilario returned to the show as well.

From September 19, 2022, to January 14, 2023, Vhong Navarro temporarily left the program after he surrendered to the National Bureau of Investigation (NBI) due to the arrest warrants from the Regional Trial Court (RTC) Taguig, in connection with the act of lasciviousness filed by Deniece Cornejo and Atty. Ferdinand Topacio. K-pop and P-pop groups have been guested on the show including SB19, BGYO, Bini, TAN and TFN. In November 2022, Ryan Bang finally won his first Magpasikat championship just as Vhong Navarro had been transferred to Taguig City Jail. On January 13, 2023, Vice Ganda suddenly gave a hint or clue to tease the audience about a comeback return of one of the hosts to the show. On January 16, 2023, Vhong Navarro returned to the program after 4 months of his absence.

In the newest segment Girl On Fire premiered in October 2022, "Ate Girl" Jackie Gonzaga takes on her first main host role.

TV5 simulcast 
On July 6, 2022, report of MJ Marfori through TV5's flagship newscast Frontline Pilipinas, it was announced that the program would have a back-to-back collaboration with TV5's noontime show, Tropang LOL (formerly known as Lunch Out Loud) without definite date and reason yet. Until it was confirmed on July 11 during their live broadcast with a move of timeslot to 12:45 pm with Tropang LOL's timeslot moved to an earlier 11:00 am, serving as a pre-programming to It's Showtime. This is the latest ABS-CBN produced program to be simulcast to TV5 alongside ASAP Natin To, FPJ: Da King Movie Block, ABS-CBN/Kapamilya Channel's Primetime Bida weeknight evening block, Idol Philippines and Everybody, Sing!.

On July 16, 2022, coinciding with their simulcast debut on TV5, the program refurbished its title card and opening theme song, as well as having a return to live studio audience after two years of suspension from March 9, 2020, making the first variety show on Philippine TV to do so after two years. While Studio 3 was on undergoing renovations, the show temporarily utilized Studio 10, which is used for ASAP Natin 'To, until July 23 when they returned to its home studio two days later with a brand new club-themed set.

Hosts 

Current hosts
Vhong Navarro 
Anne Curtis 
Vice Ganda 
Teddy Corpuz 
Jugs Jugueta 
Karylle 
Jhong Hilario 
Ryan Bang 
Amy Perez 
Kim Chiu 
Ion Perez 
Jackie Gonzaga 
Ogie Alcasid 
MC Calaquian 
Lassy Marquez 
Cianne Dominguez

Show segments

Magpasikat 

Magpasikat is the annual talent competition for It's Showtime hosts, usually held either a week before the show's anniversary date, October 24, or during the week itself (although Magpasikat 2021 and Magpasikat 2022 was held on November). The performances are evaluated by a special panel of hurados (judges). Jugs Jugueta and Teddy Corpuz hold the most number of Magpasikat wins with 6, followed by Karylle with 5.

Isip Bata 
It is a game segment for kids. In Mondays-Fridays, the contestants, also known as the Madlang Isip Bata, will be instanly give 10,000 Philippine pesos. In Saturdays, celebrities will also play and receive instant 10,000 pesos in cash.
In Round 1 called Choose Ko Po!, the contestants will fall in line after the Batang Cute-po (a mock of FPJ's Batang Quiapo) give opinions to the contestants. If the pupils of Grades 1-6 students fall in line in answers, they won.
In Round 2 called ApPair Tayo, the contestant will pick his/her kid in the bowl (Bowl-lilit). The batang cute-po give opinion to the contestant and he/she choose the answer and pair the answer.
The contestant who paired the answers, win 50,000 Philippine pesos.
This segment airs Mondays to Saturdays.

Tawag ng Tanghalan

Reception

Awards and nominations

Ratings 
Showtime debuted on its pre-noontime slot on October 24, 2009, with a 14.0% national TV rating based on Kantar Media Philippines. Its immense popularity ended the dominance of talk show SiS on its timeslot. GMA Network replaced SiS with Diz Iz It!, a competition similar to Showtime, but it was cancelled after five months.

Showtime first grand finals held in July 2010 received a 35% national TV rating, beating the 8.9% rating of Diz Iz It! and 13.7% of Eat Bulaga! The second grand finals held in December 2010 scored a 23.4% national TV rating against Eat Bulaga! 17.4%. The third grand finals in May 2011 also delivered a rating of 21.3% versus Eat Bulaga! 17%.

It's Showtime debuted on its noontime slot on February 6, 2012, with a 13.6% national rating. The episode received an overall 16.3% rating when the viewership numbers from Studio 23 were added. Initially placing behind Eat Bulaga!, the show's rating peaked to a 20.9% national rating during the finals of the "Bida Kapamilya" segment and its third anniversary week-long celebration.

The finals of the Kalokalike segment in June 2013 garnered a 26.8% national TV rating, leaving Eat Bulaga! and Wowowillie with 13.2% and 2.8% ratings, respectively. The finals of the segment's second iteration posted a 21.6% national TV rating, once again beating Eat Bulaga! 15.8% and Wowowillie 2.6%.

It's Showtime continued its dominance in the noontime slot with its fourth anniversary week special held from October 21–26, 2013.

The program faced heavy competition in 2015 when the sixth anniversary special only scored a 10.2% national TV rating, four times behind Eat Bulaga!. This is due to the Tamang Panahon special (and the build-up before that), which served as the climax of the then-popular Kalyeserye segment which featured AlDub.

It's Showtime quickly regained its prominence on its time slot when Tawag ng Tanghalan launched in 2016. The program garnered a 33.6% national TV rating during the singing competition's first grand finals. Tawag ng Tanghalan continued its winning streak during its second-season finale when it posted a national TV rating of 31.0% against Eat Bulaga! 9.5%. It's Showtime topped the ratings game once again during the first grand finals of Miss Q and A segment on June 30, 2018, with a national TV rating of 28.4% versus Eat Bulaga! 11.1%.

The second Miss Q and A grand finals posted a national TV rating of 27.4%, beating Eat Bulaga! 10.6%, Asawa Ko, Karibal Ko 13.8%, and Tadhana 11.3%.

Tawag ng Tanghalan third-season finale posted a national TV rating of 25.8%, beating Eat Bulaga! 10.4% and Hanggang Sa Dulo Ng Buhay Ko 9.5%.

Controversies

Rosanna Roces' statements on teachers 
Showtime came under fire when controversial statements were made by guest hurado Rosanna Roces against certain groups, especially teachers during an episode in January 2010. ABS-CBN relieved Roces of her jury duty as a form of self-regulation, but Movie and Television Review and Classification Board (MTRCB) placed the program under a 20-day preventive suspension on January 11, 2010. A placeholder variety show titled Magpasikat was aired in lieu of Showtime; Magpasikat had essentially the same talent show format as Showtime except that the competing groups are composed of celebrities.

The suspension only lasted for six days after the Court of Appeals issued a 60-day temporary restraining order against the MTRCB's suspension. Showtime eventually returned on air on January 19, 2010.

In March 2010, MTRCB ordered a total one-month suspension of the program because of the incident, including the replacement program Magpasikat. The MTRCB also directed the filing of criminal charges against Florida Tan, ABS-CBN vice-president for programming, and other officers "responsible for the violation." Bong Osorio, head of ABS-CBN's Corporate Communications said that the suspension was not yet final and that they were seeking appeal before the Office of the President. The variety show later on won the case because the MTRCB had not presented new arguments that would justify a reversal of its previous resolution.

Gabriela's criticism on Nasaan Ka, Mr. Pastillas segment 
The program's daily reality-dating game segment Nasaan Ka, Mr. Pastillas? drew ire from netizens and women's group Gabriela for "pimping" Angelica Yap or popularly known as Pastillas Girl. The program issued a statement to denounce Gabriela's complaint, saying that it is "hurtful and offensive to women like Angelica who has done nothing wrong but to share her story with the hope of getting another shot at love." It also clarified the segment's intent of helping Yap find love and recover from a failed relationship. MTRCB summoned the show's executives to give a list of suggestions on how to improve the segment.

GirlTrend member's joke on orphans 
GirlTrend member Erin Ocampo drew flak from netizens after making a joke about being an orphan during the PUROKatatawanan segment. As part of a skit, she asked Hashtag member Jimboy Martin "how to make an ugly child" with Martin retorting that she should ask her mother. Ocampo responded by saying that Martin should ask his real parents instead because he is adopted. Norfil Foundation Inc., a non-profit organization that provides help to orphaned children, called on MTRCB and DSWD to take corrective action as it branded the joke "insensitive and ignorant." The program made an on-air apology the following day. Plus, "Purok Katatawanan" segment was suspended and was replaced to Mimime 3 the new day. Girltrend Erin is as well fired from the Girltrend Group.

Miss Q & A finalist's wardrobe malfunction 
Miss Q & A grand finalist Lars Pacheco suffered a wardrobe malfunction in an October 2019 episode. The contestant's dress accidentally slipped off causing part of her chest to be exposed. It's Showtime apologized to viewers who may have been offended by the accident.

Mistake on PiLing Lucky segment 
It's Showtime issued an apology after a production mistake made on PiLing Lucky segment during a February 27, 2020, episode. In the segment, the contestant is asked to select one among 24 paintings for a chance to win either the cash prize of P550,000, or the negosyo (business livelihood) package. It was found out that none of the paintings contained the jackpot prize and the contestant was later awarded the negosyo package.

Question in Mas Testing segment 
On November 9, 2020, It's Showtime drew flak from netizens when the hosts asked which among Gaya Sa Pelikula actors Ian Pangilinan and Paolo Pangilinan was more straight during the Mas Testing segment. "tigasin" (lit. 'tough'), "magaling magpalabas" (lit. 'good in releasing') and "kulot" (lit. 'curly'). This prompted netizens on Twitter to highlight the importance of sexual orientation, gender identity, and gender expression awareness and education.

Soundtrack

A soundtrack album composed of five music tracks featuring the It's Showtime hosts was released in October 2010.

Track listing 
All songs produced by DJ M.O.D.

International versions 
The show spawned its first international franchise in 2019, titled It's Showtime Indonesia, which premiered on March 25, 2019, on MNCTV. It's Showtime became ABS-CBN's first non-narrative format to be franchised by another country.

Notes

References

External links 

 
2009 Philippine television series debuts
2010s Philippine television series
2020s Philippine television series
ABS-CBN original programming
Dance television shows
Philippine variety television shows
Filipino-language television shows
Television productions suspended due to the COVID-19 pandemic